Abdur Razzak (born 15 June 1982) is a Bangladeshi former cricketer who played in all formats of the game. Abdur is the first Bangladeshi to take 200 wickets in ODIs. He is also the first left arm spinner and second spinner after Saqlain Mushtaq to take a hat-trick.

He made his first-class debut at Bangladeshi domestic level for Khulna Division in the 2001/02 season. Best known for being a tall left-arm orthodox spin bowler, he helped guide his division to the National Cricket Title in his maiden season. From there he was selected for Bangladesh A (training team for the full national squad) performing well against Zimbabwe A, including figures of 7 for 17 in one game in Dhaka.

Though he has played just nine Tests, he has been more successful in One Day Internationals (ODIs) and was Bangladesh's leading wicket-taker in the format in 2013, when he reached the 200 wickets milestone.

In January 2018, he became the first Bangladesh player to take 500 wickets in first-class cricket. After four years, he made comeback to the Test squad on 8 February 2018 against Sri Lanka, taking 4-63 opening the bowling, but Bangladesh lost by 215 runs. In November 2019, he took his 600th first-class wicket, becoming the first Bangladeshi bowler to reach the milestone.

In February 2021, Abdur announced his retirement from all forms of cricket.

Domestic career

Indian Premier League
Abdur was the only Bangladeshi to play in the 2008 Indian Premier League making him the first Bangladeshi to play the league. He was bought for $50,000 by the Royal Challengers Bangalore and played in only one match. Despite not playing often for the team, Abdur believed that the experience he gained from the tournament was important. He stated that Anil Kumble "was very helpful when I asked him about bowling in Test matches. He told me that given my bowling approach, it is very important to use variations within my line and length. Actually, captains would want a breakthrough from me so without using variations, wickets are hard to come by. Coach Venkatesh Prasad was also a great help".

Bangladesh domestic career
Abdur responded by taking his best bowling figures in first-class cricket (8/123). His match haul of 15/193 against Barisal Division were the best in the history of the National Cricket League, breaking the record set three years previously by Elias Sunny, the bowler who had replaced Abdur in the Test team.

In April 2018, he was the leading wicket-taker in the 2017–18 Bangladesh Cricket League, with 43 dismissals in six matches, a record for the tournament. He was also the leading wicket-taker in the 2018–19 Bangladesh Cricket League, with 34 dismissals in six matches.

He was the leading wicket-taker for Prime Bank Cricket Club in the 2018–19 Dhaka Premier Division Cricket League tournament, with 19 dismissals in 16 matches. He was the leading wicket-taker in the 2019–20 National Cricket League, with 31 dismissals in five matches.

International career

Debut years
Abdur was called into the Bangladesh national team for the 2004 Asia Cup One Day International tournament, making his debut against Hong Kong in July.  He established himself as a regular fixture in the squad although he was not a regular in the starting eleven. He made his Test debut in the second Test of the Australian tour of Bangladesh in April 2006.

After impressing in one-day cricket, he was called up for his Test debut at home to Australia at the Chittagong Divisional Stadium. Bangladesh batted first and he recorded 15 in his first Test match innings. A decent start but he failed to take a wicket in Australia's only innings and he registered a golden duck in an innings defeat. His next test appearance took place a year afterwards against Sri Lanka where he got first test wicket having Chamara Silva caught. He got Graeme Smith in a Test against South Africa and he got his highest Test match score of 33 in both innings, once finishing unbeaten. In a Test match against New Zealand, he registered his highest Test match bowling figures of 3–93. This and the next Test in the series (subsequently his last so far) brought his bowling action into question.

Suspension
Following New Zealand's tour of Bangladesh in October 2008, Abdur was reported by umpires Daryl Harper and Asoka de Silva for having a "suspect bowling action". This was the second time in his career that he had been reported for his bowling action. A bowler is deemed to have thrown the ball if his arm bends by more than 15 degrees when delivering the ball. It had been expected that only Abdur's quicker ball was suspect and he would be disallowed from bowling it, however tests showed that Abdur bends his arm by 22–28 degrees, usually averaging 25 degrees although his quicker ball was delivered at an average of 24 degrees. As a result, Abdur was suspended from international cricket, although he is allowed to bowl under supervision in domestic cricket, until he remodels his action. In March 2009, the ICC lifted Abdur's suspension after he changed his bowling action; now both his stock delivery and faster ball are legal.

Return after suspension
In July 2009, on Bangladesh's tour of the West Indies, Abdur represented Bangladesh in international cricket for the first time since his suspension. Omitted from the Test squad, he was called up for the one-day series. Abdur's performance in the first One Day International, for which he was awarded the man-of-the-match award, helped Bangladesh defeat the West Indies by 52 runs. He opened the bowling and took 4 wickets for 39 runs (4/39) against a West Indies side weakened by disputes between the players and the West Indies Cricket Board. He finished as Bangladesh's leading wicket-taker in the three match series, with 7 wickets at 22.85, however he was injured in the final match. The hamstring strain he sustained while batting ruled him out of Bangladesh's tour of Zimbabwe in August 2009. By the time Zimbabwe toured Bangladesh for a five-match ODI series in October and November 2009, Abdur had recovered from his injury and was included in the Bangladesh squad. He took 15 wickets in the series which Bangladesh won 4–1 and was named Man of the Series.

Late career
At the start of November 2010, the BCB announced 16 central contracts. Abdur was one of six players in the top level. He was included in Bangladesh's 15-man squad for the 2011 World Cup. Zimbabwe returned to Test cricket in August 2011 with a one-off match against Bangladesh. Bangladesh lost the match, their first Test since touring England in June the previous year, with Abdur taking two wickets for 106 runs. In the subsequent five-match ODI series, Abdur was the least successful of the bowlers to deliver 20 overs or more taking two wickets in four matches as Bangladesh lost the series 3–2. When the West Indies toured in October he went wicketless in the ODI series and was subsequently dropped from the Test squad, which led him to consider the international retirement in 2014.

On 28 March 2013 he took 5 wickets against Sri Lanka in the 3rd ODI and became the 1st Bangladeshi bowler who took 200 wickets in ODI. On 5 May 2013, at the 2nd ODI between Zimbabwe in Bulawayo, he scored his maiden half-century with 53* runs. At the same time, he achieved quickest half-century in cricket history of Bangladesh. But his team was defeated by 6 wickets. He is the first left arm spinner and 2nd spinner after Saqlain Mushtaq took a Hat-trick.

However, his milestone in first-class cricket to become the first Bangladeshi to take 500 wickets, he was added to the Bangladeshi Test squad as a cover for injured Shakib Al Hasan. He made his comeback match against Sri Lanka on 8 February 2018 and took 4 wickets to bowl out Sri Lanka for 222 in their first innings.

Post retirement
In March 2020 Razzak was offered a position in the Bangladesh national selection panel however the COVID-19 pandemic delayed his appointment to the role until January 2021. He stated he would make a decision on whether to continue playing domestic cricket after his appointment was announced. On 13 February 2021, Abdur along with Shahriar Nafees announced their retirement from all forms of cricket.

References

External links
 

1982 births
Living people
Bangladesh Test cricketers
Bangladesh One Day International cricketers
Bangladesh Twenty20 International cricketers
Bangladeshi cricketers
21st-century Bangladeshi cricketers
People from Khulna
Khulna Division cricketers
Khulna Tigers cricketers
Royal Challengers Bangalore cricketers
One Day International hat-trick takers
Cricketers at the 2007 Cricket World Cup
Cricketers at the 2011 Cricket World Cup
Rangpur Riders cricketers
Sylhet Strikers cricketers
Kala Bagan Krira Chakra cricketers
Sheikh Jamal Dhanmondi Club cricketers
Bangladesh South Zone cricketers
Bangladesh under-23 cricketers
Agrani Bank Cricket Club cricketers